James Fadiman (born May 27, 1939) is an American writer known for his research on microdosing psychedelics. He co-founded the Institute of Transpersonal Psychology, which later became Sofia University.

Early years
Fadiman was born in New York City to a Jewish family and grew up in Bel Air.  His father, William Fadiman, was a producer, story editor, and book reviewer in Hollywood, one of his credits being The Last Frontier.

Education/research and psychedelic counterculture
Fadiman received a Bachelor of Arts degree from Harvard University in 1960 and a Master's degree and a doctorate (both in psychology) from Stanford University, the PhD in 1965. While in Paris in 1961, his friend and former Harvard undergraduate adviser Ram Dass (then known as Richard Alpert) introduced him to psilocybin. 
 
As a graduate student at Stanford, Fadiman was Stewart Brand's LSD guide on Brand's first LSD trip in 1962, at Myron Stolaroff's International Foundation for Advanced Study in Menlo Park, California. While living in Menlo Park, Fadiman and his wife were Ken Kesey's Perry Lane neighbors and friends.

In 1963, Fadiman worked at Stanford's Augmentation Research Center, a division that did research on networked computing. He was also part of the team in the psychedelics in problem-solving experiment at the International Foundation for Advanced Study, which was abruptly halted in 1966.

Fadiman is a proponent of microdosing and collects anecdotal reports from those who practice it.

Transpersonal psychology and personality theory
Fadiman and Robert Frager cofounded the Institute of Transpersonal Psychology (now known as Sofia University) in 1975.  He was a lecturer in psychedelic studies there. 

Fadiman was a president of the Association for Transpersonal Psychology. He was also a director at the Institute of Noetic Sciences from 1975 to 1977.

In 1976, Fadiman and Frager published a textbook on personality theory, Personality and Personal Growth, which was one of the first to incorporate Eastern theories of personality alongside Western approaches and the first of its kind to include chapters on women. Personality and Personal Growth has been republished in seven editions as of 2012.

Personal life
Fadiman is married to documentary filmmaker Dorothy Fadiman and is the father of Florida Atlantic University professor Maria Fadiman. His uncle was Clifton Fadiman, and he is a cousin of Anne Fadiman.

Fadiman has a chapter giving advice in Tim Ferriss's book Tools of Titans.

Works
Books
 The Psychedelic Explorer's Guide: Safe, Therapeutic, and Sacred Journeys Paperback (2011) 
 Personality and Personal Growth (7th Edition) (with Robert Frager) (2012)  
 The Other Side of Haight: A Novel (2004) 
 Essential Sufism (1998) Castle Books 
 Unlimit Your Life: Setting and Getting Goals (1989) 
 Motivation and Personality (with Robert Frager and Abraham Harold Maslow) (1987) 
 Transpersonal Education: A Curriculum for Feeling and Being (1976) Co-edited with Gay Hendricks. Prentice Hall, 
 Your Symphony of Selves:Discover and Understand More of Who We Are (2020) (co-authored with Jordan Gruber). 

Workshops and talks
 Psychedelic Horizons Beyond Psychotherapy, Psychedelic Science 2013 Conference – April 2013, Multidisciplinary Association for Psychedelic Studies
 Psychedelics and Buddhism, October 12, 2012, Multidisciplinary Association for Psychedelic Studies

Films
 2013 documentary film, Science and Sacraments
 2009 documentary film, Inside LSD from National Geographic
 Late 1960s documentary film, Drugs in Our Culture from the Prelinger Archives

References

External links
 

1939 births
Living people
American cognitive psychologists
American spiritual writers
American psychedelic drug advocates
American consciousness researchers and theorists
People from Los Angeles
Psychedelic drug researchers
Stanford University alumni
Harvard University alumni